The Russian University of Transport (RUT (MIIT)), officially the Autonomous Educational Institution of Higher Education "Russian University of transport" is a public university founded in 1896 and headquartered in Moscow, Russia. Along with its main campus located in the capital, the university maintains one other regional campus in Sochi.

RUT is a leading transport educational institution and hosts the biggest university complex in Moscow, Russia. RUT is under the governance of the Ministry of Transport of the Russian Federation.

History
Russian University of Transport was established as the Imperial Moscow Engineering School (IMIU) by decree of Emperor Nicholas II on May 23, 1896, in order to train engineers for the construction of the Trans-Siberian Railway. Training courses began on 12 September 1896. The first director of the university was professor F.E. Maksimenko. The first course of engineers graduated in 1901 (three-years theoretical course and two-years building practice). The Russian University of Transport is the oldest institution of higher technical education in Russia founded in 1896. Today TUT is the largest scientific and academic complex in Russia, the all Russian leader in the field of training and retraining of specialists and scientific personnel for transport and transport construction. On 15 June 1993, MIIT got the status of the university and its name was changed to the Moscow State University of Railway Engineering.

For more than 120 years of history, more than 650 thousand highly qualified specialists with higher and secondary professional education have left the university. They successfully work in transport and in other various sectors of the economy in Russia and 57 countries of the world. More than 30 Heroes of the Soviet Union and Socialist Labor, transport industry leaders, world-famous scientists, members of the Russian government, governors, mayors of large cities, prominent public figures, prominent representatives of the Russian Orthodox Church and culture, and top businessmen are among the graduates of RUT.

Structure of the university
Institutes: 
 Institute of Transport Engineering and Operation Systems
 Institute of Railway Track, Construction and Structures
 Institute of Operation and Digital Technologies
 Institute of Economics and Finance
 Institute of International Transport Communications
 Law Institute

Academies: 
 Basic Training Academy
 Academy of Water Transport
 Russian Academy of Railway Engineering
 Russian Open Transport Academy

Research Institute: 
 Scientific Research Institute of Transport and Transport Construction

Branches and representative offices: 
 Sochi Institute of Transport - branch of the federal state autonomous educational institution of higher education "Russian University of Transport", Sochi branch of RUT (MIIT)Colleges and technical schools:''' 
 Gymnasium
 College of the Academy of Water Transport
 Medical College
 Moscow College of Transport,
 Law College of the Law Institute

Notable alumni
Semyon Belits-Geiman, Soviet Olympic swimmer
Bidzina Ivanishvili, Georgian businessman and politician
Vitaly Malkin, Russian businessman and politician
Konstantin Borovoi, Russian businessman and politician
Igor Guberman, Russian-Israeli poet
Anatoly Rybakov, Soviet and Russian writer
Roustam Tariko, Russian businessman
Yakov Dzhugashvili, son of Joseph Stalin
Igor Zaitsev, Soviet Grandmaster
Gregory Kaidanov, Russian-American Grandmaster
Viktor Vekselberg, Russian businessman
Len Blavatnik, Russian-American businessman
Vladimir Kuzmin, Russian musician 
Victor Cherkashin, Longtime KGB officer in America, handler for Ames and Hanssen 
Alexander Maslyakov, Russian television personality, founder of KVN
Isidore Mvouba
Fu Zhihuan
Yaakov Kedmi

References

External links 
 Official site of Russian University of Transport

Universities in Moscow
Educational institutions established in 1896
1896 establishments in the Russian Empire
Transport education
Engineering universities and colleges in Russia
Cultural heritage monuments of regional significance in Moscow